Celebrity Theatre is a theater in the round located in Phoenix, Arizona.

Construction and features 
Beverly Hills architect Perry Neuschatz designed the 196 foot-diameter building as a multipurpose conference center. He received the 1964 top award from the Prestressed Concrete Institute (PCI) for his outstanding design. Gary Call was the associate architect. T. Y. Lin International was the structural engineer and E. L. Farmer Construction Company was general contractor. Owners planned to use Celebrity Theatre as a concert venue during the winter. It was further renovated significantly in 1995. The building was listed on the National Register of Historic Places in 2019.

The stage is 30 feet in diameter and completely round, exposed to the audience on all sides. An unusual feature of the theater is that the entire stage can turn through a complete revolution at a speed of up to 0.5 revolutions per hour, thus allowing everyone in the audience to see every part of the stage at some point during a two hour performance. None of the 2650 seats in the theater are more than 70 feet from the stage. The theater is equipped with an orchestra pit and can be reconfigured as a proscenium stage if necessary, although this reduces the seating capacity by 25% to 50% depending on configuration.

Notable performances
The theatre opened on January 13, 1964 with the musical "South Pacific" starring Betsy Palmer. In the years since, the theatre has hosted such stars as George Carlin, Van Halen, Joe Cocker, Carol Channing, Diana Ross, Billy Joel, Def Leppard, Vikki Carr, Bill Cosby, The Goose Creek Symphony, Dr. Hook, Duran Duran, Sammy Davis Jr., Sir Tom Jones, Black Sabbath, Sweathog, Smashing Pumpkins, Louis CK, Sam Kinison, Chris Rock, Lynyrd Skynyrd, David Bowie, Iron Maiden, B.B. King, Pepe Aguilar, Olivia Newton-John, Nat King Cole, Marvin Gaye, The Pretenders, Frankie Valli, Rocio Durcal, Roger Daltrey, Frank Zappa, Engelbert Humperdinck, Hall & Oates, Don Rickles, Phish, Fleetwood Mac, Etta James, The Brian Setzer Orchestra, Jack Benny, Wayne Newton, Liberace and My Favorite Murder among many other legendary performers.

Mexican artist Yuridia performed here on September 5, 2009. She returned for her "6 Tour" on November 5, 2016.

George Carlin filmed his second HBO special, George Carlin: Again!, here in 1978. It was considered the first stand-up comedy routine done "in the round".

During a March 16, 1993, performance, Phish covered Aerosmith's "Sweet Emotion".

In 2012 Lil' Kim performed as a part of her Return of the Queen Tour to mark her musical comeback.

In February 2013, Louis C.K. filmed his HBO special Oh My God, his fifth full-length comedy special. The round stage was made blue in color, to resemble the way it appeared when George Carlin filmed George Carlin: Again!.

See also
 Theater in the round

References

External links
 

1963 establishments in Arizona
1964 establishments in Arizona
Buildings and structures in Phoenix, Arizona
Music venues in Arizona
Theatres in Arizona
Tourist attractions in Phoenix, Arizona
National Register of Historic Places in Phoenix, Arizona